Lyonetia lechrioscia is a moth in the  family Lyonetiidae. It is known from Australia.

The larvae mine the leaves of their host plants, Quintinia sieberi and Quintinia verdonii.

References

External links
Australian Faunal Directory

Lyonetiidae
Leaf miners